Mick Barnard was a guitarist in the UK rock band The Farm (sometimes called Farm, and not to be confused with the 1980s/1990s British band of the same name). He was also the guitarist of the band Genesis for a brief time, following the departure of founding member Anthony Phillips, just before Steve Hackett came in and replaced him. Barnard does not appear on any released Genesis recordings.

After leaving Genesis, Barnard embarked on a successful career in audio engineering, founding the Bel Digital Audio company in 1975.

Stint in Genesis
Genesis' final concert with the Trespass line-up (Tony Banks, Peter Gabriel, Mike Rutherford, Anthony Phillips, John Mayhew) was on 18 July 1970, after which Phillips left the band. In early August 1970, drummer Mayhew was replaced by Phil Collins, and the band played concerts as a four-piece until 23 October 1970.  Mick Barnard who had been suggested by Aylesbury Friars impresario David Stopps then joined the band.  The Banks-Gabriel-Rutherford-Collins-Barnard line-up played shows from 3 November 1970 to 10 January 1971:  a total of thirty concerts and one television appearance.  Barnard was then replaced by Steve Hackett, and this new line-up played their first concert on 14 January 1971.

Barnard appeared with the band on their earliest TV appearance on a BBC Television programme called Disco 2.  This was recorded on 14 November 1970.  Gabriel sang live, but all the instrumentalists (including Barnard) mimed to their recorded tracks.  This footage is now lost. 

Tony Banks made the following comment about Barnard's guitar playing:

He was OK, but not really forceful enough. I remember when we had already auditioned Steve but were still rehearsing with Mick which wasn't a very nice thing to do, we were doing the end part of "The Musical Box" and he was playing this little guitar phrase over the top of it and we thought this was really good.  So just as we were about to boot him out he did something quite good.

References

Year of birth missing (living people)
Living people
English rock guitarists
Genesis (band) members
Lead guitarists
English audio engineers